Kristián Mensa (born 21 October, 1997), better know by his stage name Mr. Kriss, is a Czech actor, dancer and illustrator based in London, UK. He is the winner of 2019 Red Bull Dance Your Style - Czech Republic. He was also listed on the Huffington Post's 20 Under 20 list of gifted young innovators of 2018, as well as The World's Smartest Teens in 2018. Mensa's art work has been reviewed by prominent news agencies around the world including Bored Panda, Designboom, Metro, BuzzFeed, etc.

Early life and education
Mensa was born in 1997, in Prague, Czech Republic, in a family with African ancestry. His grandfather was from Kumasi, Ghana. He received his primary education from ZŠ s RVJ K Milíčovu, an elementary school in Prague. He attended Gymnázium Na Vítězné pláni, Prague from 2011 to 2018 where he completed his secondary education. In 2015, Mensa attended Arvada High School in Colorado, USA as an exchange student. From 2018 to 2019, Mensa attended University of Europe for Applied Sciences in Berlin and joined Vysoká škola kreativní komunikace (VŠKK) in the late 2019 where he studied Visual Effects and Animation.

Career

Art career
Mensa started his professional artistic career in 2015 with his solo exhibition, Brewed Awakenings, in Arvada, Colorado. From 2015 to 2019, he exhibited his art works throughout Europe at multiple solo and group exhibitions. Mensa is recognized for humanising architecture and layering colourful, tangible objects atop his simple drawings. His work and point of view came to the attention of Huffington Post, where he appeared in their 20 Under 20 list of gifted young innovators of 2018. Mensa was also listed in The World's Smartest Teens in 2018 by The Best Schools.

Over the years, Mensa collaborated with and created art works for renowned brands such as Heinz, Pilot, Red Bull, Adidas and WWF-UK. His art work has been featured in Bored Panda, Designboom, CCMA TV3, Metro.co.uk, DeMilked, Huffington Post, BuzzFeed, The Tax Collection, MyModernMet, Awesome Inventions, Courrier International, Art Sheep, AfroPunk, Red Bull and Arch Daily.

Dance career
At the age of 16, in 2014, Mensa participated in King Of The Kidz World Finals in Amsterdam where he finished in top 16. In 2017, Mensa won the dance competition, Break Central Vol. III in London. Subsequently, in the late 2017, he finished at the first place at Juste Debout in Bratislava and at Mindless - Experimental Dance Battle in Luxembourg.

During Eurovision Song Contest 2018 in Lisbon, Portugal, Mensa performed alongside Mikolas Josef who represented the Czech Republic. Also in 2018, he performed at I Love This Dance in Paris, France. At the 2019 Red Bull Dance Your Style - Czech Republic, Mensa, competing as Mr. Kriss, won the first place and qualified for participation in the  first-ever Red Bull Dance Your Style world finals that took a place in Paris on October 12, 2019. Earlier that year, Mensa also won Break Central Vol. V in London.

In 2020, Mensa performed alongside Kylie Minogue for her music video of the song "Magic". Prior to that, Mensa has also performed in the music videos of several prominent musicians such as Rita Ora, Skyline and Baynk.

Beside being an artist and a dancer, Mensa is also an actor. He appeared in 2011's Czech film, Peklo s princeznou as a child artist. He has also worked in the Czech short film, Bo Hai in 2017 and Backstage in 2018. In 2020, Mensa appeared in a movie called Who is Mr. Kriss?, directed by Adolf Zika.

In November 2017, Mensa spoke at the TEDxYouth@Praha in Prague.

References

External links

Czech dancers
Czech illustrators
Czech people of Ghanaian descent
People from Prague

1997 births
Living people